Schwalmtal is a municipality in the district of Viersen, in North Rhine-Westphalia, Germany. It is named after the river Schwalm, which flows through the area. Schwalmtal is situated approximately 12 km west of Mönchengladbach.

References

External links

Viersen (district)